Sir Leonard Gregory Parsons MRCS FRCP FRCOG FRS (25 November 1879 - 17 December 1950) was a British Paediatrician.

Parsons studied at Mason College and the University of Birmingham from 1896 to 1903. He graduated with a University of London external degree in medicine in 1903.

He was Professor of Paediatrics at Birmingham University and dean of University of Birmingham Medical School. In 1932 he was the first to use synthetic Vitamin C to treat scurvy in children.

Parsons was awarded the Royal College of Physicians’s Moxon Medal in 1942 and delivered their Harveian Oration in 1950. He received a knighthood in 1946. He was elected a Fellow of the Royal Society in 1948.

References

1879 births
1950 deaths
Alumni of University of London Worldwide
Alumni of the University of London
Alumni of the University of Birmingham
British paediatricians
Academics of the University of Birmingham
Fellows of the Royal College of Physicians
Fellows of the Royal Society